Juan Manuel Márquez Méndez (born August 23, 1973) is a Mexican former professional boxer who competed from 1993 to 2014. He is the third Mexican boxer (after Érik Morales and Jorge Arce) to become a world champion in four weight classes, having held nine world major titles from featherweight to light welterweight, including the lineal championship at lightweight.

In a career that spanned over twenty years, Márquez was known for being a fast and highly technical boxer who was exceptionally skilled at combinations and counterpunches, yet also willing to engage in slugfests with opponents. He was also credited for his toughness, and never lost a fight by stoppage. His most notable bouts include his four-fight saga with Manny Pacquiao and his fight against fellow Mexican Marco Antonio Barrera.

Márquez is considered to be one of the greatest boxers of all time, and is ranked by BoxRec as the thirteenth greatest boxer of all time and the second greatest Mexican boxer of all time, pound for pound. He was inducted into the International Boxing Hall of Fame in the class of 2020.

Amateur career
Márquez had an amateur record of 82-4, with 72 wins by knock-out.

Professional career

Featherweight
He made his professional boxing debut at age 19 on May 29, 1993, losing via disqualification to Javier Duran. Márquez remained undefeated for six years, compiling a 29–1 record that included wins against future champions Agapito Sanchez, Julio Gervacio and Alfred Kotey. In 1997, Márquez won the WBO NABO Featherweight title, which he defended seven times. During this time, he was referred to as the "best fighter without a world title." Márquez was WBO Featherweight Champion Naseem Hamed's mandatory challenger for 22 straight months. However, the WBO allowed Hamed to schedule other fights instead. During this time, Márquez worked as an accountant while training under Ignacio Beristáin in Mexico City. Márquez would keep this job until winning his first world title in 2004.

Márquez vs. Norwood
In 1999, Márquez faced Freddie Norwood for the WBA Featherweight title instead. Márquez was knocked down in the second round. In the 8th round, Norwood's glove touched the canvas after an exchange. However, it was not ruled a knock down by the referee who was standing opposite to the action. In the 9th round, Márquez scored a knockdown after a two punch combination. Márquez lost via controversial unanimous decision. HBO Punchstat had Norwood landing 73 out of 290 punches thrown to Márquez's 89 of 444.

On November 20, 1999, Márquez faced Remigio Molina and defeated him in eight rounds. In 2000, he defeated former champion Daniel Jimenez and five fights later, he defeated future champion Robbie Peden in ten rounds and captured the NABF & USBA Featherweight titles.

Featherweight champion
Márquez received his second bout for a world title on February 1, 2003, when he defeated former four-time Featherweight Champion Manuel Medina and captured the vacant IBF Featherweight title. In the 2nd round, Márquez connected with a three-punch combination that floored Medina. The fight was stopped in the 7th round after Márquez knocked Medina down for a second time.

He then defeated Derrick Gainer later in the year in a unification bout to win the WBA Featherweight title and become the WBA (Super) Champion.

Márquez vs. Pacquiao I
In May 2004, Márquez fought Lineal & The Ring Featherweight Champion Manny Pacquiao in a bout where Márquez was knocked down three times in the 1st round.  Márquez outboxed Pacquiao for the remainder of the bout which was ended in a controversial, split-decision draw. The final scores were 115–110 for Márquez, 115–110 for Pacquiao and 113–113. Judge Burt A. Clements (who scored the bout 113–113) later admitted to making an error on the scorecards, because he had scored the first round as 10–7 in favor of Pacquiao instead of the standard 10–6 for a three-knockdown round.

Defending unified titles
On September 18, 2004, Márquez made his first appearance on pay-per-view, being on the undercard of Bernard Hopkins vs. Oscar De La Hoya, defeating and retaining his unified titles against future champion Orlando Salido. On May 7, 2005, he made his fourth title defense and first appearance on Showtime Championship Boxing, facing Victor Polo while walking away with a unanimous decision victory. In August 2005, Márquez was stripped of his WBA and IBF unified Featherweight titles for his inability to defend them against various boxers after potential bouts failed to draw a bid.

Márquez vs. John
In 2006, Márquez attempted to regain a title, coming up short in a unanimous decision loss to undefeated Indonesian boxer Chris John in Indonesia for the WBA Featherweight Championship title. The loss led to the Ring Magazine's removal of Márquez from its pound for pound.

In late 2006, Márquez captured the Interim WBO Featherweight title by defeating Thai boxer Terdsak Jandaeng. He defended it against Filipino boxer Jimrex Jaca with a nine-round knockout in Hidalgo, Texas. Márquez was promoted to world champion status in December 2006 when previous champion Scott Harrison vacated the title. Márquez vacated the Featherweight title the following year to challenge WBC Super Featherweight Champion Marco Antonio Barrera.

Super featherweight

Márquez vs. Barrera
On March 17, 2007, Márquez became the WBC Super Featherweight Champion by defeating Barrera in Las Vegas via unanimous decision, by the official scores of 116–111, 116–111 and 118–109. Márquez's first defense of his title was to be held on September 15, 2007, against Argentinian boxer Jorge Rodrigo Barrios. However, Barrios withdrew from the bout due to injury, prompting American boxer Rocky Juárez to challenge Márquez for the title on November 3, 2007, in a losing effort.

Márquez vs. Pacquiao II

On November 29, 2007, Márquez announced that he would defend his title in a rematch with Pacquiao. On March 15, 2008, Márquez lost his Super Featherweight title to Pacquiao via split decision. Márquez suffered a knockdown in the third round that proved to be the difference, as the remaining rounds were scored dead even. Compubox scoring had Márquez landing 42 of 201 (21%) jabs to Pacquiao's 43 of 314 (14%) and landing 130 of 310 (42%) power punches to Pacquiao's 114 of 305 (37%). Richard Schaefer, Golden Boy Promotions CEO, offered a $6 million guarantee to Pacquiao for a rematch. Pacquiao's promoter, Bob Arum, said, "I'm not saying they'll never fight again, but you have to let it bake for a while." Pacquiao said: "I don't think so, this business is over" as he planned to move up to the lightweight division.

Lightweight

Márquez vs. Casamayor

Márquez moved up to the lightweight division in order to fight The Ring Lightweight Champion Joel Casamayor on the weekend leading up to Mexican Independence Day at the MGM Grand, Las Vegas, Nevada. On September 13, 2008, he defeated Casamayor in the 11th round after two knockdowns and captured his sixth world title in three different weight classes. In the first four rounds of the bout, Márquez continually walked into counter punches from Casamayor. It took Márquez until the fifth round to be able to find the range with his right hand. By the fifth round, a cut over Casamayor's right eye was opened from a clash of heads. Rounds five, six, seven and eight were rounds where Márquez landed straight punches from the outside, but he was also struck by Casamayor whenever he lunged forward. Two minutes into the eleventh round, Casamayor was knocked down by a right punch as he pulled away from an intense exchange. Casamayor was able to get on his feet, but it was clear he was still shaken from the knockdown. As soon as the action was allowed to resume, Márquez went in for the kill as he let his punches go in furious combination. Casamayor punched back, but he was knocked down again with about 7 seconds left in the round. Referee Tony Weeks stepped in the bout and stopped the fight as he deemed Casamayor unable to continue. The official judges had the fight scored 95–95, 95–95 and 97–93 for Márquez before the 11th-round knockout. After the win, The Ring ranked Márquez second on its pound for pound list and rated him the number one boxer in the lightweight division.

Márquez vs. Diaz I

On February 28, 2009, Márquez defeated former WBA, WBO & IBF Lightweight Champion Juan Díaz by knockout. Díaz controlled the fight early in the bout as the two boxers exchanged punches. Díaz opened a cut above Márquez's right eye in the fifth round and looked to control the bout, but Márquez responded by opening a gash above Díaz's right eye and stunning him with a left hook before the end of the eighth round. Márquez landed two hard rights to Díaz's face in a three-punch combination that knocked Díaz down with 35 seconds remaining in the ninth round. Díaz rose, but seconds later, Márquez followed with a right uppercut to the chin that knocked Díaz down for a second time. Referee Rafael Ramos waved an end to the fight after two minutes and 40 seconds of the ninth round. With the victory, Márquez defended his The Ring Lightweight title and claimed the vacant WBO and vacant WBA (Super) Lightweight titles. This bout was named "Fight of the Year" for 2009 by The Ring magazine and ESPN.com. After the fight, Márquez expressed an interest in fighting Floyd Mayweather Jr.

Welterweight

Márquez vs. Mayweather

Márquez moved up to the welterweight division and fought undefeated pound for pound champion Floyd Mayweather Jr. The fight was scheduled to take place at 144-pound catch weight on July 18, 2009, at the MGM Grand Garden Arena; but was postponed due to a rib injury sustained by Mayweather. The bout was rescheduled and held on September 19, 2009. During the official weigh in, Márquez weighed in at 142 lbs and Mayweather weighed in at 146 lbs, thereby incurring a financial penalty as he was 2 pounds over the catchweight. It was later discovered that both parties had agreed just before the weigh-in to allow Mayweather fight over the catchweight with Mayweather paying additional $600,000 due to arriving two pounds over the 144 lbs weight limit. Mayweather controlled the action in the fight. Márquez struggled to conquer Mayweather's defense and could not get out of the way of his counter punches. Márquez landed only 19% of his punches according to Compubox punch stats. Mayweather knocked Márquez down in the 2nd round. Mayweather won the fight by unanimous decision.

This was the fifth non-heavyweight fight in boxing history to sell more than one million pay-per-views, with the official HBO numbers totaling about $52 million. It was also the first fight to sell more than one million PPVs without featuring Oscar De La Hoya. Two months later, Manny Pacquiao vs. Miguel Cotto would sell 1.25 million PPVs.

Return to Lightweight

Márquez vs. Diaz II

When asked upon his return to the lightweight division, Márquez said: "I came back to lightweight because at welterweight I lost a lot of speed."

Márquez then began negotiations for a rematch with Juan Díaz. Golden Boy CEO Richard Schaefer said the fight for Márquez's title was being planned for July 10 as the main event of an HBO PPV card. He said it would "probably" take place at the MGM Grand in Las Vegas. After his comeback in 2010, fellow Mexican boxer Erik Morales said he would like to fight Márquez. Morales returned two divisions higher in 2010, as a welterweight. However, Márquez has also stated that he would be interested in a fight with Ricky Hatton.

The Márquez-Díaz rematch took place on July 31, 2010, at the Mandalay Bay. Márquez's titles were also at stake. Prior to the bout, the WBO ordered the Márquez-Díaz winner to fight mandatory challenger Michael Katsidis. Márquez won the fight via unanimous decision by the official scores of 117–111, 116–112 and 118–110. After the Díaz rematch, Márquez stated that he was interested in pursuing a third fight with Manny Pacquiao. There was also a possibility of him moving up to light welterweight to face any of the titleholders at the time: Timothy Bradley, Devon Alexander or Amir Khan, all of whom were fighting on HBO.

Márquez vs. Katsidis

A few weeks after the Juan Díaz fight, Golden Boy Promotions officially announced that Márquez would defend his lightweight titles against mandatory challenger, WBO Interim Champion Michael Katsidis, on November 27, 2010, at the MGM Grand in Las Vegas and that the bout would be televised live on HBO Championship Boxing. During the official weigh in for their 135 lb bout, Márquez came in at 134 pounds, while Katsidis came in on the limit of 135 pounds. Despite being knocked down in the third round, Márquez came back and defeated Katsidis by a ninth-round TKO to retain the lightweight belts. At the time of the stoppage, the Mexican boxer was ahead on all the scorecards by 77–74, 78–74 and 76–75. During the post fight interview, he once again expressed his interest in a third fight with Manny Pacquiao.

Márquez is the oldest world champion in the history of the lightweight division. On January 4, the WBA no longer recognized Márquez as their Super Champion due to going 18 months without fighting a mandatory challenger as required by the organization's rules. Fernando Beltrán of Zanfer Promotions stated that the WBA's decision had no validity and that he would immediately send them a letter, since the deadline of May 2012 for the mandatory defense had not expired, and Márquez paid sanctioning fees to the WBA even for the last few non-lightweight fights. On January 26, Márquez was stripped of his WBO title, as he was considered to be moving up to the welterweight division. The WBO promoted Interim titleholder Ricky Burns to full champion status. The Ring magazine stripped of him of their championship on April 17.

Light welterweight
Márquez moved up to light welterweight division to fight Likar Ramos on July 16, 2011, at Mexico. It was considered a tune-up fight before his third battle with Manny Pacquiao. The fight only lasted one round with Márquez winning by technical knockout. Many experts queried whether Ramos was hired to 'take a dive' (have the contest fixed or lose it on purpose) in order for Márquez to look good.

Return to welterweight

Márquez vs. Pacquiao III

Márquez attracted controversy by hiring strength and conditioning coach Angel "Memo Heredia" Hernandez, who had supplied performance-enhancing drugs to sprinters Marion Jones and Tim Montgomery in 2000.

On November 12, Márquez lost to Pacquiao via controversial majority decision. The decision was voted the "Robbery of the Year," in 2011 by The Ring Magazine readers.

Return to light welterweight

Márquez vs. Fedchenko
On April 14, 2012, Márquez defeated Ukrainian contender Serhiy Fedchenko via unanimous decision to capture the interim WBO light welterweight title by a clear margin with scores of 119-109, 118-110, 118-110. The WBO later updated him to full status WBO Champion.

Third return to Welterweight

Márquez vs. Pacquiao IV

Márquez fought Manny Pacquiao on December 8, 2012. The fight was for the WBO's "Champion of the Decade" belt. Márquez knocked down Pacquiao in the 3rd round with a looping right hook. In round 5, Pacquiao returned the favor, knocking down Márquez. Pacquiao went on the offensive in the 6th round. While behind the scorecards and with just 1 second left in the 6th round, Márquez countered Pacquiao's jab with an overhand right, sending Pacquiao face first to the canvas, resulting in a knockout. Pacquiao, who had not been knocked out in over 13 years since his loss to Medgeon Singsurat in 1999, remained unconscious for several minutes. This was named The Ring magazine's "Fight of the Year" and "Knockout of the Year" and "International Fight of the Year" by the British website BoxRec. Márquez was also named "International Fighter of the Year" by the same publication.

Márquez vs. Bradley

Márquez fought Timothy Bradley in a bout billed as 'The Conquerors' for his WBO welterweight title at the Thomas and Mack Center in Las Vegas, Nevada on October 12, 2013. Márquez was looking to win a title in a fifth weight class. The fight went the distance as Márquez lost by split decision (115-113, 113-115, 112-116). CompuBox stats showed Bradley landed 168 punches of 562 thrown while Márquez landed 153 punches of 455 thrown. However, Márquez connected on 115 power punches to Bradley's 86. In the post fight interviews, Bradley said "I gave him a boxing lesson. He couldn't touch me. I had complete control." Márquez replied, "I clearly won. I have been robbed six times in my career. You don't have to knock down the other guy to win the fight." The fight drew 375,000 ppv buys on HBO PPV and 13,111 in attendance drawing a live gate of $2,998,950.

Márquez vs. Alvarado
On May 17, 2014, at The Forum, in Inglewood, California, Márquez was back in action in a welterweight bout against former WBO Junior Welterweight Champion Mike Alvarado (34-2, 23 KOs) for the WBO International welterweight title. The fight was also a WBO welterweight title eliminator, with the winner to earn a mandatory shot against Manny Pacquiao for the title he regained April 12 against Timothy Bradley in their rematch. Despite the fight being a welterweight eliminator, it was agreed to be fought with a 143-pound maximum. Alvarado weighed in at 143.2 lbs. In a one sided bout, Márquez defeated Alvarado by unanimous decision with the judges scores of 119-108, 117-109, 117-109. Alvarado was down in round eight and Márquez was knocked down in round nine.

Inactivity and retirement
There were negotiations from January 2016 for a fight between Márquez and former four-weight division champion Miguel Cotto. The main issue between both camps being the weight with Márquez looking to fight at no more than 147lbs and Cotto looking to fight at 155lb catchweight. Miguel Cotto Promotions told ESPN.com that negotiations had broken down on August 2 as both camps could not settle on what weight the fight would be. After nearly three years out, Márquez announced he would be entering camp in January 2017. Márquez revealed he would have a named opponent and date for his next fight by the end of April 2017. Márquez had been training at the Omanza gym. According to trainer Ignacio Beristáin, Márquez was looking to return in Toluca, Mexico on June 24, 2017. It was then pushed back to August 19. Due to venues not being available for that date, Zanfer Promotions said a date in September or October would be more suitable with the venue being in Monterrey.

On August 4, 2017, Márquez announced his retirement from professional boxing after a 21-year career. Márquez spoke to ESPN Deportes TV show Golpe a Golpe, "Today is a special and sad day for me because I'm announcing my retirement. The injuries pushed me to make this decision. It hurts, but I believe the right moment to put an end to my career has arrived. I would have loved to do a final fight to say goodbye inside the ring, but I have to listen to my body, and it was telling me that the right moment to stop boxing is now." He ended his career with a record of 56 wins, 7 losses and 1 draw, with 40 knockouts. Márquez admitted the decision was hard to make, but initially made the decision 10 days prior to announcing it.

Personal life
Márquez was born in Mexico City. He grew up in a rough and poor area of Iztacalco, many of his friends succumbing to gang violence and dying young while he went on to box. Márquez has said that he has always been a good student and that he likes numbers. He studied and became an accountant, and worked for several government agencies. He gave up on his accounting work and focused entirely on his boxing career.

He started practicing boxing at the age of eight inspired by his father's training. He stated that he likes to "eat well" and does not follow any kind of diet. His brother, Rafael Márquez, is a former world champion in the bantamweight and super bantamweight divisions. They both trained under Ignacio Beristáin and assistant Gilbert Márquez. At one time, the two were listed in Ring Magazine's top ten pound-for-pound list. They are one of four sets of Mexican brothers to hold world titles. 
Márquez and his wife, Erika have two sons and a daughter.

Márquez is a member of the PRI (Institutional Revolutionary Party).

Márquez has been a commentator on the ESPN boxing show Golpe a Golpe since 2011.

Márquez makes an appearance in the 2005 video game Fight Night Round 2.

Professional boxing record

Pay-per-view bouts

See also
List of featherweight boxing champions
List of super-featherweight boxing champions
List of lightweight boxing champions
List of light-welterweight boxing champions
List of boxing quadruple champions
List of Mexican boxing world champions
Notable boxing families

References

External links

Juan Manuel Márquez profile at About.com

1973 births
Living people
Mexican male boxers
Boxers from Mexico City
Mexican accountants
Welterweight boxers
World featherweight boxing champions
World super-featherweight boxing champions
World lightweight boxing champions
World light-welterweight boxing champions
World Boxing Association champions
World Boxing Council champions
International Boxing Federation champions
World Boxing Organization champions
The Ring (magazine) champions
International Boxing Hall of Fame inductees